Karutha Pakshikal (English: Black Birds) is a 2006 Indian Malayalam-language family-drama film written and directed by Kamal. It stars Mammootty, Meena, and Padmapriya.

Plot
Widower Murugan moves to Kerala with his three children and irons clothes to make a living. While dealing with daily issues, he also aims to fund the operation of his child who is visually impaired. They come across Meena who belongs to a rich household and is living thee last days of her life as she is suffering from a disease. She bonds with the family, especially the visually impaired daughter of Murugan, and writes her consent to have her eyes donated to the child after her imminent death. The family, especially the children are caught in a dilemma whether to wish for her death (as that would mean eyes for the child) or her recovery. Murugan advises them to pray for her good health. Later, she dies but her busy husband and family does not care about her pledge to donate eyes and she is cremated without eye donation procedures. Initially saddened by this turn of events, Murugan and the family goes back to their usual life with their positive outlook amidst poverty.

Cast
 Mammootty as Murugan
 Meena as Suvarna (Voice dubbed by Praveena)
Padmapriya as Poongodi 
 Malavika Nair as Malli, Murugan's daughter 
 Jagathy Sreekumar
 Rajesh Hebbar as Suvarna's husband
 Reshmi Boban
 Salim Kumar
 T. G. Ravi
 Anoop Chandran
 Narayanankutty
 Lishoy

Awards
National Film Awards
 2006 National Film Award for Best Film on Family Welfare
Kerala State Film Awards
 2006 Kerala State Film Award for Second Best Actress - Padmapriya
 2006 Kerala State Film Award for Best Child Artist - Baby Malavika
 2006 Kerala Film Critics Association Awards for Best Actor - Mammootty
Filmfare Awards South
 2006 Filmfare Award for Best Actor – Malayalam - Mammootty
 2006 Filmfare Award for Best Actress – Malayalam - Padmapriya
Asianet Film Awards
 2006 Best Actress - Padmapriya
 2006 Best Child Artist - Baby Malavika
 2006 Best Sound Recordist - Anoop, Vinod

References

External links 
 

2006 films
2000s Malayalam-language films
Best Film on Family Welfare National Film Award winners
Films shot in Thrissur
Films directed by Kamal (director)